James Edward Bailye Cope (born 5 May 1966) is an English schoolteacher and former first-class cricketer.

Cope was born at Leigh-on-Sea in May 1966. He was educated at St John's School in Leatherhead, before going up to Keble College, Oxford. While studying at Oxford, he played first-class cricket for Oxford University, making his debut against Gloucestershire at Oxford in 1986. He played first-class cricket for Oxford until 1988, making a total of twelve appearances. Playing as a wicket-keeper, he scored 28 runs and took 13 catches and made a single stumping. 

After graduating from Oxford, Cope became a teacher. His early roles were in Africa, where he taught in schools in Namibia, Kenya and Togo, in addition to working for the University of Khartoum in Sudan. Upon his return to England, he was employed in state schools, before joining the staff of St Edward's School, Oxford in 2001. He is currently the Deputy Head Pastoral at St Edward's, in addition to being the master in charge of cricket.

References

External links

1966 births
Living people
People from Leigh-on-Sea
People educated at St John's School, Leatherhead
Alumni of Keble College, Oxford
Schoolteachers from Oxfordshire
Oxford University cricketers
Academic staff of the University of Khartoum